The Western Amateur is a leading annual golf tournament in the United States for male amateur golfers. It is organized by the Western Golf Association. The Western Amateur features an international field of top-ranked amateur golfers. It was first held in 1899, making it the third-oldest amateur golf event in the world.

The tournament was first held at Glen View Club in Golf, Illinois. The location has varied since, with the most events held at Point O'Woods Golf & Country Club near Benton Harbor, Michigan, including a stretch from 1971 to 2008. The winner receives the George R. Thorne championship trophy and, until 2007, an exemption to play in the Western Open, the PGA Tour's annual stop at Cog Hill Golf & Country Club in Lemont, Illinois.

World Golf Hall of Fame member Chick Evans holds a record eight Western Amateur titles. Past winners also include golf greats Jack Nicklaus, Tiger Woods, Ben Crenshaw, Justin Leonard, Phil Mickelson, Curtis Strange, Hal Sutton, Francis Ouimet, Lanny Wadkins, and Tom Weiskopf.

In December 2021, the Western Amateur joined with six other tournaments to form the Elite Amateur Golf Series.

Winners

Future sites

Source

References

External links

Official site of the Western Golf Association

Amateur golf tournaments in the United States